Jonathan Bennett may refer to:

Jonathan Bennett (actor) (born 1981), American actor
Jonathan Bennett (mathematician), British mathematician and winner of the Whitehead Prize
Jonathan Bennett (philosopher) (born 1930), British philosopher
Jonathan Manu Bennett (born 1969), New Zealand actor
Jonathan Bennett (born 1973), creator of AutoIt

See also
John Bennett (disambiguation)